Hajjar may refer to:

A. (Abraham) William Hajjar, (1917–2000), American architect 
Bandar Al Hajjar (born 1953), Saudi Arabian economist
Hana Hajjar, Saudi artist and political cartoonist
Joseph Hajjar (1923–2015), Syrian-born Melkite Catholic priest
Lisa Hajjar, American academic
Mitra Hajjar (born 1977), Iranian actress
Sleiman Hajjar (1950–2002), Melkite Catholic bishop of Canada
Tony Hajjar (born 1974), Lebanese American drummer